Axel Borgmann (born 8 July 1994) is a German professional footballer who plays as a left-back for FC Energie Cottbus.

Honours
Schalke 04
Under 19 Bundesliga: 2011–12

FC Vaduz
Liechtenstein Football Cup: 2015–16, 2016–17, 2017–18

References

External links
 

Living people
1994 births
Sportspeople from Mülheim
German footballers
Footballers from North Rhine-Westphalia
Association football defenders
Regionalliga players
Swiss Super League players
Swiss Challenge League players
Eredivisie players
FC Schalke 04 II players
FC Schalke 04 players
FC Vaduz players
German expatriate sportspeople in Liechtenstein
Expatriate footballers in Liechtenstein
VVV-Venlo players
FC Energie Cottbus players
German expatriate footballers
German expatriate sportspeople in Switzerland
Expatriate footballers in Switzerland
German expatriate sportspeople in the Netherlands
Expatriate footballers in the Netherlands